Salesian High School (SHS) is an American  private high school for boys in New Rochelle, New York.

It was established in 1920 and is part of the Salesians of Don Bosco. It is located in the Roman Catholic Archdiocese of New York.

The school is located on the waterfront along Long Island Sound on the former estate of John Stephenson, the inventor of the horse-drawn trolley car. The Stephenson Mansion, a historic home, took seven years to build during the 1860s at a reported cost of $250,000. After Stephenson's death in 1893, the property passed through several hands before the Salesians of Don Bosco bought it in 1919.

Today, the mansion is the headquarters of the Salesian Order's Eastern Province and is known as the Salesian Provincial Residence.

References

External links 
 

1920 establishments in New York (state)
Boys' schools in New York (state)
Catholic secondary schools in New York (state)
Education in New Rochelle, New York
Educational institutions established in 1920
Private high schools in Westchester County, New York
Salesian secondary schools